The C4I Corps (Heyl HaTikshuv), or Teleprocessing Corps, is a combat support corps of the Israel Defense Forces (IDF) under the command of the Teleprocessing Branch, formerly the Computer Service Directorate. The C4I Corps is responsible for all areas of teleprocessing and communications in the IDF. The corps commander is known as the chief teleprocessing officer and is an officer with the rank of "Tat Aluf", equivalent to a brigadier general in the United States Army. The current commander of the corps is Yossi Karadi.

History

The Haganah Communications Service was established in 1937 and in the same year the first Morse Code radio operators’ course was held. At that time in the British Mandate, they operated 12 underground broadcasting stations. In 1938 they brought 150 carrier pigeons to the country. In 1939 the first broadcast station run by the Etzel, also known as the Irgun, was activated. The first communications officer course was held in 1947, and in the time of the Jerusalem blockade, radio communication equipment was installed on Palmach armored vehicles that went up to the city.

After the establishment of the State of Israel and the IDF, the Communications Corps was established on October 14, 1948.

With the establishment of the Computer Service Directorate in 2003, the C4I Corps became one of its subordinate units, but in 2005 as part of comprehensive organizational changes in the Ground Forces Command, the C4I Corps together with the Ordnance Corps, Logistics Corps, and Adjutant Corps became subordinate elements of that headquarters. In 2007 it was decided to return the C4I Corps to the Computer Service Directorate and over the course of the year 2008 the decision was implemented.

Commanders

References

External links

 IDF C4I Corps Official Website

Corps of Israel